Gary Black may refer to:
 Gary Black (cricketer) (born 1954), English cricketer
 Gary Black (politician) (born 1958), American politician